Feliksas Vaitkus (1907–1956), also known as Felix Waitkus, was an American-born Lithuanian pilot and the sixth pilot to fly solo across the Atlantic.

Biography
His parents came from Lithuania in 1904, settling in the old "Lithuanian Downtown" in Chicago's Bridgeport neighborhood where Vaitkus was born three years later. He enlisted in the U.S. Army in 1928, and after graduating from advanced pilot’s training school, was commissioned a second lieutenant in the Air Corps. In 1931, he was placed in the reserves with the rank of first lieutenant and returned to civilian life to work with his father-in-law who operated a flying school in Kohler, Wisconsin.

Lituanica II

A few months after the Lituanica tragedy, some prominent members of the Chicago Lithuanian community discussed the possibility of financing another transatlantic flight. This idea was greeted with much enthusiasm, and enough funds were raised during this difficult period, the Great Depression. A much faster and more modern aircraft (compared to the original Lituanica) was purchased from the Lockheed Aircraft Corp., called the Lockheed Vega, the same model used by Wiley Post in his round-the-world flight, and by Amelia Earhart, the first woman to fly solo across the Atlantic.

The aircraft was christened Lituanica II on Sunday, April 22, 1934. When the pilot originally chosen for the flight unexpectedly resigned in the spring, the Lithuanian organizers turned to Feliksas Vaitkus, and he accepted the challenge to fly to Lithuania.

The original flight date was postponed to 1935 because modifications were needed to strengthen the aircraft's structure due to the installation of extra fuel tanks and a more powerful engine. New equipment was added, which Darius and Girėnas did not have, such as a variable-pitch propeller to improve engine performance and a radio compass. Lituanica II was test-flown extensively to ensure its success.

Flight

Vaitkus arrived at Floyd Bennett Field in New York in May 1935. That year, prior to his arrival, no pilots had been able to fly over the Atlantic due to poor weather conditions, and so he had to wait until the chief meteorologist gave him a favorable weather report. It was not until four months later, on the evening of September 20, he was informed that the weather along his route had improved, where conditions were average, with no major changes expected in the next 24 hours. Encouraged with this news, Vaitkus decided to fly.

The next day, September 21, at 6:45 in the morning, Lituanica II was headed for Europe. Unfortunately, Vaitkus had to fight the worst possible weather conditions, flying through rain, fog, and icing, so that most of his navigation had to be by his new radio compass. More than once he noticed ice forming on the wings and had to descend to a lower altitude until it thawed off. Vaitkus was helped considerably by hourly broadcasts from an Irish radio station. He learned that Dublin was fogged in, as well as all areas heading east as far as the Baltic Sea. He knew that he could not make it to Kaunas due to his low fuel supply, and being exhausted after a 23-hour struggle fighting the elements, he felt it was best to come down somewhere in Ireland.

He spotted an open field in Cloongowla at Ballinrobe, County Mayo and landed there, with the aircraft suffering extensive damage. He was lucky to be alive and uninjured. Lituanica II was crated for shipment to Lithuania, where it would be restored. By ship and by train he made his way to Kaunas where he was given a hero’s welcome.

Feliksas Vaitkus was the only pilot to fly across the North Atlantic in 1935, and even though he landed in Ireland and not in Kaunas, he was entered in aviation’s history books for being the sixth pilot to fly solo across the Atlantic.

He was recalled to active duty in the Army Air Corps in 1940, serving as the chief test pilot at the Boeing Aircraft Co. in Seattle, testing hundreds of B-17 and B-29 bombers. He was recalled again to serve in the U.S. Air Force during the Korean War.

He died of a heart attack while stationed at Wiesbaden, Germany, on July 25, 1956, at the age of 49. His body was shipped home and interred in his wife’s family plot in the Kohler Cemetery at Sheboygan, Wisconsin. At the time of his death, he held the rank of lieutenant colonel.

References

External links

"The Second Transatlantic Flight. Felix Waitkus: Forgotten Hero" by Edward W. Baranauskas

1907 births
1956 deaths
American people of Lithuanian descent
Aviation history of the United States
Lithuanian aviators
United States Army colonels
People from Kohler, Wisconsin
Military personnel from Wisconsin